The 2019 Ole Miss Rebels baseball team represented the University of Mississippi in the 2019 NCAA Division I baseball season. The Rebels played their home games at Swayze Field.

Previous season

The Rebels finished 48–17 overall, and 18–12 in the conference. The Rebels tied their school record for wins, won a share of the SEC Western Division Championship, and won the SEC Tournament. The Rebels entered the 2018 NCAA Division I baseball tournament as the #4 National Seed. The Rebels looked to continue their hot streak as they won the first 2 games of the Oxford Regional. However, the Rebels were upset twice in one day by the Tennessee Tech Golden Eagles to spoil their trip to the Super Regionals.

2018 MLB draft selections

The Rebels had eight players selected in the 2018 MLB draft. The Rebels also had two signees drafted out of high school.

Players in bold returned to Ole Miss.
†Both Gunnar Hoglund and Kaleb Hill were drafted out of high school, but decided to attend Ole Miss.

Preseason

Preseason All-American teams
1st Team
Parker Caracci - Relief Pitcher (Perfect Game)

2nd Team
Parker Caracci - Relief Pitcher (Collegiate Baseball)
Parker Caracci - Relief Pitcher (D1Baseball)
Parker Caracci - Relief Pitcher (NCBWA)

3rd Team
Parker Caracci - Relief Pitcher (Baseball America) 
Thomas Dillard - Outfielder (D1Baseball)
Ryan Olenek - Outfielder (Collegiate Baseball)

SEC media poll
The SEC media poll was released on February 7, 2019 with the Rebels predicted to finish in second place in the Western Division.

Preseason All-SEC teams

1st Team
Cole Zabowski - First Baseman

2nd Team
Tyler Keenan - Third Baseman
Chase Cockrell - Designated Hitter/Utility
Parker Caracci - Relief Pitcher

Roster

Schedule and results

Schedule Source:
*Rankings are based on the team's current ranking in the D1Baseball poll.

Oxford Regional

Fayetteville Super Regional

Awards and honors

Award watch lists

Regular season awards

All-SEC Awards

All-American Awards

Record vs. conference opponents

2019 MLB draft

Rankings

References

Ole Miss
Ole Miss Rebels baseball seasons
Ole Miss Rebels baseball
Ole Miss